Gotec Group based in Wülfrath, Germany, is an automotive corporation from Germany which has production and sales locations in 7 different countries including Poland, Spain, Brazil, Turkey, United States, Germany and Romania.

External links 
Global site

Automotive companies of Germany
Manufacturing companies established in 1978
German brands
1978 establishments in West Germany